Micro miniature (also called micro art or micro sculpture) is a fine art form. Micro miniatures are made with the assistance of microscopes, or eye surgeon tools. It originated at the end of 20th century.

The Metropolitan Museum of Art in New York City holds a micro-miniature basket made by a Pomo Native American artist around 1910. 

The Museum of Jurassic Technology in Culver City, California has a collection of the microminiatures of the Armenian artist Hagop Sandaldjian in their permanent exhibition, The Eye of the Needle.

The Museum of Miniatures located in Prague focuses on works of microminiature art. It features the work of Edward Ter Ghazarian, Anatoly Konenko, Nikolai Aldunin among others.

The Museum of Microminiatures in St. Petersburg includes micro-miniature work by Vladimir Aniskin of Novosibirsk, Siberia, as well as Nikolai Aldunin of Moscow.

Artists
 Nikolai Aldunin
 Vladimir Aniskin
 Rafik Badalyan
 Anton Chekhov
 Edward Kazarian
 Anatoly Konenko
 Mallikarjuna Reddy
 Hagop Sandaldjian
 Gunasekaran Sundarraj
 Nicolaï Syadristy
 Edward Ter-Ghazarian
 Willard Wigan

References

Further reading
Ermann, Lynn. They have jobs on the slide: Microscopic art, The Washington Post, February 14, 1999

Sculpture
Microscopy